Pine Prairie High School is an elementary and high school in Pine Prairie, Evangeline Parish, Louisiana, United States serving grades PK–12.

Athletics
Pine Prairie High athletics competes in the LHSAA.

References

External links
 

Public high schools in Louisiana
Public elementary schools in Louisiana
Schools in Evangeline Parish, Louisiana